Kevin Ingram (born April 26, 1962) is a former American football quarterback in the National Football League who played for the New Orleans Saints. He played college football for the East Carolina Pirates. He also played in the Canadian Football League for the Edmonton Eskimos.

References

1962 births
Living people
American football quarterbacks
New Orleans Saints players
Edmonton Elks players
East Carolina Pirates football players
National Football League replacement players